The English rugby union league pyramid is topped by the Premiership. Below this are the Championship and National Leagues 1 to 3. Below this, the structure is split geographically into four regions: Midlands, North, London and South East, and South West. With the exception of the Midlands leagues, which only has regional splits, below these regional leagues are county leagues (e.g. Sussex, Kent, Hampshire). The county leagues are the lowest levels in the English game.

Structure

Premiership

 Bath
 Bristol Bears
 Exeter Chiefs
 Gloucester
 Harlequins
 Leicester Tigers
 London Irish
 Newcastle Falcons
 Northampton Saints
 Sale Sharks
 Wasps
 Worcester Warriors

RFU Championship

 Bedford Blues
 Cornish Pirates (formerly Penzance and Newlyn)
 Doncaster Knights
 Ealing Trailfinders
 Jersey Reds
 London Scottish
 London Welsh
 Nottingham
 Richmond
 Rotherham
 Saracens
 Yorkshire Carnegie

National League 1

 Ampthill
 Moseley
 Blackheath
 Blaydon
 Chinnor
 Cambridge
 Coventry
 Darlington Mowden Park
 Esher
 Fylde
 Hartpury College
 Hull Ionians
 Loughbororugh Students
 Old Albanians
 Macclesfield
 Plymouth Albion
 Rosslyn Park

National League 2

National League 2 North

 Caldy
 Chester
 Harrogate
 Hinckley
 Leicester Lions
 Luctonians
 Otley
 Preston Grasshoppers
 Sale
 Scunthorpe
 Sedgley Park
 Sheffield Tigers
 South Leicester
 Stourbridge
 Tynedale
 Wharfedale

National League 2 South

 Barnes
 Barnstaple
 Bishop's Stortford
 Bury St Edmunds
 Canterbury
 Cinderford
 Clifton
 Exmouth
 Henley Hawks
 London Irish Wild Geese
 Old Elthamians
 Redingensians Rams
 Redruth
 Taunton Titans
 Worthing Raiders

External links

 
England
Rugby union teams
Rugby